"Fly on the Wings of Love" is a song by Danish pop-rock duo Olsen Brothers, which was the winner of Eurovision Song Contest 2000, performing for  in English. The song was performed fourteenth on the night, following 's Serafín Zubiri with "Colgado de un sueño" and preceding 's Stefan Raab with "Wadde hadde dudde da?". At the close of voting, it had received 195 points, placing first in a field of 24. The Olsen Brothers were afforded an international hit with "Fly on the Wings of Love", most notably in Sweden, the Eurovision 2000 host nation, where "Fly on the Wings of Love" reached number one. In the performers' native Denmark, their native language rendering, "Smuk som et stjerneskud" ("Beautiful as a shooting star"), earned them a number-one hit.

Background
"Fly on the Wings of Love" is a love ballad, with the singers describing the beauty of a woman. Unusual for any pop song (even more so for one in the contest), its lyrics strongly imply that this is a beauty which has improved with age – a theme made more explicit in the Danish original "Smuk som et stjerneskud".

The song was not expected to score highly, as it was an old-fashioned ballad and performed by two of the oldest performers to enter the Contest. In spite of this, it led the voting from start to finish (a feat not achieved since ABBA won in 1974) and became a great favourite among fans of the Contest, being named one of the best entries at the Congratulations special in late 2005. The brothers in fact performed part of the song onstage and were greeted with rapturous applause (perhaps due to the special's location in Copenhagen). Renārs Kaupers, hosting the show, made several references to "being beaten by a pair of Danish brothers" (which his band Brainstorm was).

The song is also memorable for the vocoding effects given to the voice during the final chorus, which allow it to sound something like a robot. These effects were the subject of a protest by the Russian delegation, however they were not found to be against the rules and the result stood.

The song was succeeded in 2001 as winner by Tanel Padar and Dave Benton representing  with "Everybody".

It was succeeded as Danish representative at the 2001 contest by Rollo & King with "Never Ever Let You Go". The Olsen Brothers have additionally performed "Fly On The Wings Of Love" at the Romanian national Final for the Eurovision Song Contest 2010, on 6 March.

Charts

Weekly charts

Year-end charts

Certifications

XTM and DJ Chucky version

In 2000, Spanish dance act XTM recorded and released a version of the song featuring DJ Chucky and vocals from Annia. It became a hit between 2000 and 2003, peaking at number two in Spain, number one in Ireland, and number eight in the United Kingdom.

Chart performance
Upon its release in Spain, the song reached number two on the PROMUSICAE chart on 20 January 2001, behind "Love Don't Cost a Thing" by Jennifer Lopez. It stayed in the top 20 for nine weeks.

Two years after its original release, on 26 May 2003, the cover was released in the United Kingdom. It debuted at number nine on the UK Singles Chart on the week beginning 1 June, then reached its peak of number eight the next week. Over the next ten weeks, the song fluctuated around the top 20, eventually spending two more weeks at number eight before dropping out of the top 20 on 24 August and the top 100 on 12 October. Due to its longevity on the UK chart, "Fly on the Wings of Love" finished 2003 as the country's 32nd best-selling single, outselling every song that peaked at numbers four to seven. It eventually received a Silver certification from the British Phonographic Industry in 2016 for sales and streams of over 200,000.

The song was also highly successful on the Scottish Singles Chart, where it entered and spent four weeks at its peak of number three. It spent 12 weeks in the top 10, 16 in the top 40, and 20 in the top 100. In Ireland, where it reached number one for two weeks in August 2003, spent 24 weeks in the top 50, and ended 2003 as Ireland's 11th highest-selling single. The cover found moderate success in the Netherlands, climbing to number 31 in February 2004 and logging 19 weeks on the Dutch Singles Chart.

Track listings

 Spanish 12-inch single
A1. "Fly on the Wings of Love" (DJ Richard & Johnny Bass De La Cruz remix) – 5:49
A2. "Fly on the Wings of Love" (Colossos nix) – 4:38
B1. "Fly on the Wings of Love" (XTM remix I) – 5:58
B2. "Fly on the Wings of Love" (XTM remix II) – 6:08

 Spanish maxi-single
 "Fly on the Wings of Love" (DJ Richard & Johnny Bass de la Cruz radio remix) – 3:33
 "Fly on the Wings of Love" (DJ Richard & Johnny Bass de la Cruz remix) – 5:49
 "Fly on the Wings of Love" (XTM radio remix I) – 3:47
 "Fly on the Wings of Love" (XTM remix I) – 5:58
 "Fly on the Wings of Love" (XTM radio remix II) – 4:00
 "Fly on the Wings of Love" (XTM remix II) – 6:08
 "Fly on the Wings of Love" (Colossos radio edit) – 3:24
 "Fly on the Wings of Love" (Colossos mix) – 4:38

 UK 12-inch single
A1. "Fly on the Wings of Love" (original 12-inch version)
AA1. "Fly on the Wings of Love" (Flip & Fill remix)

 UK and European enhanced CD single
 "Fly on the Wings of Love" (radio mix)
 "Fly on the Wings of Love" (Flip & Fill remix)
 "Fly on the Wings of Love" (original 12-inch version)
 "Fly on the Wings of Love" (video)

 Dutch enhanced CD single
 "Fly on the Wings of Love" (radio edit) – 3:15
 "Fly on the Wings of Love" (XTM radio edit) – 3:47
 "Fly on the Wings of Love" (video clip) – 3:00

Charts

Weekly charts

Year-end charts

Certifications

Other cover versions
 In 2000 Danish producer Holger Lagerfeldt released a cover version under the name DJ Cookie with vocals by Linda Andrews.
 In 2002 German trance group Topmodelz consisting of Pulsedriver and SveN-R-G vs. Bass-T released a cover version on Aqualoop Records.

References

External links
 Lyrics from diggiloo.net

2000 singles
2000 songs
2003 singles
Animated music videos
Congratulations Eurovision songs
EMI Records singles
Eurovision Song Contest winning songs
Eurovision songs of 2000
Eurovision songs of Denmark
Irish Singles Chart number-one singles
Number-one singles in Denmark
Number-one singles in Sweden